Jetpack is based in Southern California and is primarily musician Jetpack Dan or Daniel J. (real name: Dan J. Standiford) with Michael Kramer, who drums, sings and co-produces.  Jetpack composes, records, and performs the guitar dominated instrumental music known as surf or surf rock, that was a music industry phenomenon of the early 1960s. Although it had retained a following, especially in Southern California, surf experienced a world-wide revival in the 1990s. Jetpack often mixes the traditionally accepted surf instruments, such as Fender guitars and tube amplifiers, with nontraditional instruments such as fretless bass and 12 string Rickenbacker guitars, and branches into other related subgenres of rock such as spy, noir, and rockabilly music.  Live shows find the band usually dressed as FBI agents with I.D. badges and a secret service guard at the stage.

History
Originally, Jetpack released mainly original compositions with the exception of a few cover songs. Those cover songs would gain him attention and invitations to do reinterpretations of other artists' work. Jetpack's original live performances where in the late 1980s to early 1990s. His music and sound was heavily inspired by Shadowy Men On A Shadowy Planet and The Plugz. In the mid to late 1990s, he relocated to Los Angeles and drew the attention of Pascal Records. Pascal and Jetpack licensed music to MTV for the television program, The Real World. In late 1998, recording of a studio album was begun. It was completed in 1999, but awaited release until early 2000 due to a family tragedy. The release was titled Planet Reverb.

Compilations / film and television

Daniel J. performed with Jetpack as a full band in many historical Los Angeles venues and was the opening act for Dick Dale, "King of the Surf Guitar". Later, Jetpack was placed on the same surf compilation as Dale with the 2003 release of Surf Guitar, a "best of" compilation of contemporary surf guitarists released by the Sharper Image. Pascal continued to license recordings for various compilations and films, Lion's Gate being one of the studios to feature Jetpack material in a film soundtrack. In 2004, Standiford was approached by CMH Records to produce material for their Vitamin Records division, which specialized in tribute albums. Due to his cover versions of the Hollie's "Bus Stop" and Simon and Garfunkel's "Sound of Silence", he was asked that the album feature only Jetpack and that he create a surf CD from twelve hits made famous by the band No Doubt. With Michael Kramer again adding his drumming skills to Jetpack, Surfin' to No Doubt was recorded and released in 2005. Later that year, Fuel TV featured original Jetpack music on its program, Longboard TV.  2009 saw the Dan performing with a lineup consisting of "moonlighting" members of other groups such as Oingo Boingo and the addition of a saxophone in many songs.  A live release now awaits release.

Albums
Planet Reverb (Pascal)
Sharper Image:Surf Guitar (Sugo, compilation)
Summer of 2004 (Surfbands, compilation)
Surfin' to No Doubt (Vitamin)
Attack of the 12 String (to be announced)

External links
Jetpack Page at Pascal Records
Jetpack Page at Vitamin Records
The Official Jetpack Web Site

Surf music groups